The Fall of the Giants is a fresco by the Italian Renaissance artist Giulio Romano. Born in Rome Giulio Romano was a pupil of Raphael.  In the year 1522 he was courted by Federico II Gonzaga, the ruler of Mantua, who wanted him as his court artist as he was especially attracted by his skill as an architect. In the year 1524 Romano moved to Mantua where he remained for the rest of his life. According to Vasari, Baltasare Castilliogne was delegated by Federico II Gonzaga to procure Romano to execute paintings and architectureal procjects in the city of Mantua, Italy.  His masterpiece of architecture and fresco painting in that city is the Palazzo del Te, with is famous illusionistic frescos. In one of rooms of palazzo, the Sala dei Giganti Giulio Romano had depicted the Gigantomachy,an episode derived from Greek mythology. The fresco was created between 1532 and 1534 and it  was based on Ovid's Metamorphoses, a narrative poem consisting of 15 books that was written in Latin around 8 C.E. The episode of Gigantomachy depicts Jupiter defeating the Giants with his lighting. According to other versions of the myth, Jupiter resisted the Giants' assault thanks to the intervention of Pan or of the asses of Silenus and Bacchus. Nevertheless, in the 16th century in Italy it was uncommon to hear Latin. Texts were changed in structure and substance when transferred to Vulgate, so it should be understood that Giulio Romano had used the vernacular translation of the Metamorphoses for his Gigantomachy in the Palazzo del Te. The subject was very popular in the fine arts of the Cinquecento, once for sure because of its inherent possibilities for effective aesthetic design, on the other hand because this myth was important for the self-image of a patron of that time expressing religious, moral, political ideas.

In many respects the Sala dei Giganti differs from the other rooms of the Palazzo. In areas, such as the Sala di Psyche and the Sala di Ovidio Romano had created scenes of erotic abandon and pastoral calm  but in the Sala dei Giganti the viewer confronts with scenes of chaos and violence. The great effect of the Sala dei Giganti is based on Giulio Romano's endeavor to give the viewer a total illusion conveying that he is involved in the action. The room forms a kind of round panorama; containing a single, thematically uniform painting without beginning or end. According to Vasari, it was Romano's intention to depict mountains and buildings collapsing, heavy clouds driven by the winds and the faces of the Giant's distorted by horror.

In order to explain these iconographic motifs it is wise consult the contemporary translations of Ovid's Metamorphoses because these translations played an essential role conveying the Ovidian myths. One should not assume that the artists of the time -including Giulio Romano- translated these texts without having difficulty reading their original form. The frescos of Giulio Romano are most likely be linked with the translation of the Venetian poet Niccolò delgi Agostini which first appeared in Venice, in the year 1522 and since then became the standard used translation of the second quarter of the 16th century as well as with Giovanni de Bosnignoris' translation that was printed five times in Venice and twice in Milan from 1497 to 1522.

References
 Bazzoti, Ugo, Grazia Sgrilli, Ghigo Roli, and Grace Bromelow. 2013. Palazzo Te: Giulio Romano's Masterwork in Mantua. London: Thames and Hudson.
 Dandelet, Thomas James. 2014. The renaissance of empire in early modern Europe. New York: Cambridge University Press.
Guthmüller, Bodo. “Ovidübersetzungen Und Mythologische Malerei. Bemerkungen Zur Sala Dei Giganti Giulio Romanos.” Mitteilungen Des Kunsthistorischen Institutes in Florenz, vol. 21, no. 1, 1977, pp. 35–68. 
 Tafuri, Manfredo. (1998). Giulio Romano (English ed., Architecture in early modern Italy). Cambridge ; New York, NY: Cambridge University Press.
 Pierguidi, S. (2004). "Gigantomachia" and the Wheel of Fortune in Giulio Romano, Vincenzo Cartari and Anton Francesco Doni, and the Authorship of the "Asinesca Gloria". Journal of the Warburg and Courtauld Institutes, 67, 275–284.
Vasari, Giorgio, et al. Lives of the Artists. Oxford University Press, 2008.

Notes

1530s paintings
Fresco painting
Mantua
Paintings by Giulio Romano
Paintings based on Metamorphoses